This is a list of nationwide public opinion polls that were conducted relating to the Republican primaries for the 2016 United States presidential election. The persons named in the polls were either declared candidates, former candidates, or received media speculation about their possible candidacy. On May 4, 2016, Donald Trump became the sole contender and presumptive nominee.

Aggregate polling

Individual polls

Polls conducted in 2016

Polls conducted after March 15 primaries

Polls conducted after Super Tuesday

Polls conducted after the South Carolina primary

Polls conducted after the New Hampshire primary

Polls conducted after the Iowa caucuses

Polls conducted before the Iowa caucuses

Polls conducted in 2015

Polls conducted in 2014

Polls conducted in 2013 and 2012

See also
General election polling
Nationwide opinion polling for the United States presidential election, 2016
Nationwide opinion polling for the United States presidential election by demographics, 2016
Statewide opinion polling for the United States presidential election, 2016

Democratic primary polling
Nationwide opinion polling for the Democratic Party 2016 presidential primaries
Statewide opinion polling for the Democratic Party presidential primaries, 2016

Republican primary polling
Statewide opinion polling for the Republican Party presidential primaries, 2016

References

External links 
http://elections.huffingtonpost.com/pollster/2016-national-gop-primary

Opinion polling for the 2016 United States presidential election
2016 United States Republican presidential primaries